Kaferkahel (  Kafer-Qãhël) and some says Kfarqahel (  Kfar-Qãhël) is a Lebanese village of Al-Koura villages in the North governorate. Characterized by its geographical location as it separates the district of Al-Koura and Zgharta-corner through the valley Qadisha and the river Qadisha. The village is half Greek Orthodox Christian and half Sunni Muslim).  There's a church (St.Georges) and a mosque in the center of the village and a little abandoned church on the banks of Qadisha river (St. Elias  Mar Illiess), this church is used in July to celebrate Mar Illiess.

River of Qadisha
The Kadisha River ( Nahr Qadishä) (also known as Nahr Abu-A'ali ), passes through this village..

Immigrants
There are a lot of immigrants from Kaferkahel to several countries like:

      
, 
They visit their friends and family in the summer and holidays.

Notable migrants include the McGuire family in Sydney, Australia whose original surname 'Hajjeh' was changed by the government on arrival.

John McGuire who was a judge at the district court
https://www.smh.com.au/national/integrity-steered-solicitor-to-bench-20110410-1d98e.html

Mark McGuire was changed in Australia and who went on to become Lebanese Australian of the year in 2010. https://arabicpages.com.au/article/mark-mcguire.html

Mark's son Mark McGuire jnr is currently a leading cardiologist and professor at Royal Prince Alfred Hospital.
https://www.mns.org.au/our-services/our-specialists/prof-mark-mcguire

Population
The local population do not exceed 500 inhabitants. And the main families of Kaferkahel are: 
 hadid  (Biggest Family in the village)
 Al-Ashkar (Biggest Christian Family in the Village)
 Mahfouz 
 El-Nabbout 
  Hajjeh
  Abdul Qader
 Semsom 
moufarej

Election of the municipalities of  Kaferkahel
On the last municipal elections on 30 April 2010 retired Brigadier General Nizar Abdul Qader   won under the chairmanship of the municipality, headed by Mr. Edmond El-Nabbout   as vice president, and Al-Mukhtar is Mr. Mufeed Hajjeh

References

External links

 Kfar Qahel, Localiban

Koura District
Populated places in Lebanon
Eastern Orthodox Christian communities in Lebanon
Sunni Muslim communities in Lebanon